Aaron Davis Hall is a performing arts center in Manhattan, New York City in the neighborhood of Harlem.

Aaron Davis Hall was founded in 1979 and is located on the campus of the City College of New York, between West 133rd and 135th Streets on Convent Avenue, one block east of Amsterdam Avenue. and is the northern extension of Morningside Avenue beginning at 127th Street. It consists of the Marian Anderson Theatre, named after the American contralto, and Theatre B, a black box theatre.

In 2007, it was among over 530 New York City arts and social service institutions to receive part of a $20 million grant from the Carnegie Corporation, which was made possible through a donation by New York City mayor Michael Bloomberg.

History 
In 1974, the City College announced plans for the $5.3‐million Aaron Davis Hall, which would house the school's Leonard Davis Center for the Performing Arts. The Aaron Davis Hall was opened in 1979 with a concert by many notable artists such as Mikhail Baryshnikov and Ella Fitzgerald. The architecture received acclaim for its verve and "dignified" style. 

In December 1992, the hall underwent a $250,000 renovation, which involved replacing torn carpet, repainting and sprucing up the lobby and backstage areas, and installing a new computerized lighting system and a 40-channel audio system, compared to the old system which only allowed four microphones.

In 2007, it was among over 530 New York City arts and social service institutions to receive part of a $20 million grant from the Carnegie Corporation, which was made possible through a donation by New York City mayor Michael Bloomberg.

Notable performers and visitors 

 American Symphony Orchestra
 Mikhail Baryshnikov
 Harry Belafonte
 Ornette Coleman
 Gil Evans
 Suzanne Farrell
 Ella Fitzgerald
 Freddie Hubbard
 Bill T. Jones
 Alicia Keys
 Ted Koppel
 David Letterman
 Nelson Mandela
 Patricia McBride
 Barack Obama
 Paul Smith Trio
 Max Roach
 Nancy Wilson
 Lillias White

See also
Music of New York City
List of museums and cultural institutions in New York City
Croton Aqueduct Gate House

References

External links

Harlem
City College of New York
University and college arts centers in the United States
Music venues in Manhattan
Event venues in Manhattan
Event venues in New York City
Performing arts centers in New York City
Tourist attractions in Manhattan

Event venues established in 1979
Music venues completed in 1979
1979 establishments in New York City